Baboo Band Baaja is a Marathi film directed by debutante Rajesh Pinjani and produced by Nita Jadhav. The film tells the riveting tale of a father reluctant to educate his son, a mother who fiercely believes in its liberatory value, and the son who is caught in the crossfire. It stars Milind Shinde, Mitalee Jagtap Varadkar and Vivek Chabukswar in the lead roles. The film received three National Film Awards,  including for Best Actress (Mitalee Jagtap Varadkar) and Best Debut Film of a Director, and six Maharashtra State Film Awards.

Plot
Baboo Band Baaja is a story of a man (Milind Shinde) who plays in a local band to earn a living. He wants his son (Vivek Chabukswar) also to take up the same profession. The mother (Mitalee Jagtap Varadkar), on the other hand, wants to provide education to her son. The film shows the irrepressible surge to soar in life pitted against the vicious grip of circumstances.

Cast
 Milind Shinde
 Mitalee Jagtap Varadkar
 Vivek Chabukswar
 Sanjay Kulkarni
 Namrata Awate

Production
Rajesh Pinjani was inspired by his mentor Purshottam Jadhav, an IAS officer who supported his cause of making short films on subjects such as no smoking, save the girl child and so on. Pinjani was also inspired by the various films shown at Pune International Film Festival (PIFF) and decided to make one of his own. Pinjani says, "I was inspired by the various films shown at PIFF and decided to make one of my own. A friend suggested that I should make a film on brass bands. I was looking for a director for six months, but eventually decided to direct the film myself. The film, because of its extensive research, took almost one and a half years to complete. Pinjani says, "I stayed in Kamthi near Nagpur for a while to study the lives of bandwallahs. My elder brother helped me with newspaper cuttings on the subject."

Among the lead players, only Milind Shinde is a known name from Marathi cinema. Varadkar has done a few TV serials and Marathi films. Chabukswar was selected after Pinjani watched his audition videos.

Awards
 National Film Awards
 Best Actress - Mitalee Jagtap Varadkar
 Indira Gandhi Award for Best Debut Film of a Director - Rajesh Pinjani and Nita Jadhav
 Best Child Artist - Vivek Chabukswar
 Pune International Film Festival (PIFF)
 Sant Tukaram Best Marathi Feature Film Award - Rajesh Pinjani and Nita Jadhav

References

Films featuring a Best Actress National Award-winning performance
2012 films
Best Debut Feature Film of a Director National Film Award winners
2012 directorial debut films
2010s Marathi-language films